Edgeley and Cheadle Heath is an electoral ward in the Metropolitan Borough of Stockport. It was established in 2004 by The Borough of Stockport (Electoral Changes) Order 2004.  It elects three Councillors to Stockport Metropolitan Borough Council using the first past the post electoral method, electing one Councillor every year without an election on the fourth.

Together with Brinnington & Central, Davenport and Cale Green, Heatons North, Heatons South and Manor, the ward lies in the Stockport Parliamentary Constituency. At the border of the ward with Brinnington & Central lies Stockport Station, formerly known as Edgeley Station. The ward also contains Stockport Academy, formerly Avondale High School.

Councillors 
Edgeley and Cheadle Heath electoral ward is represented in Westminster by Navendu Mishra MP for Stockport.

The ward is represented on Stockport Council by three councillors:

 Louise Heywood (Lab)
 Matt Wynne (Ind)
 Georgia Lynott (Lab)

Matt Wynne was elected as a Labour candidate for the 2019 election. However on the 6th October 2022 he quit the Labour party after they deemed him unfit to stand for the 2023 election. He is currently an independent councillor. 

 indicates seat up for re-election.

Elections in the 2020s

October 2022

May 2022

May 2021

Elections in the 2010s

May 2019

May 2018 

On 17 April 2018, Stockport Council published a notice to confirm that due to the death of the Conservative candidate Maureen Baldwin-Moore the scheduled election for this ward would no longer take place on 3 May 2018, and that a new poll would take place on 24 May 2018. Under the Electoral Administration Act, the Conservatives were allowed to select a replacement candidate, but new nominations by other parties were not permitted.

May 2016

May 2015

May 2014

May 2012

May 2011

References

External links
Stockport Metropolitan Borough Council

Wards of the Metropolitan Borough of Stockport